The Battle of Tolvajärvi (['tol.va.jær.vi];) was fought on 12 December 1939 between Finland and the Soviet Union. It was the first large offensive victory for the Finns in the Winter War.

The battle took place on territory of so-called Ladoga Karelia which today is part of the Republic of Karelia.

Location and intent
The Finnish plan was to encircle the Soviet division by two pincer-attacks over the frozen lakes Hirvasjärvi and Tolvajärvi. The northern attack over Hirvasjärvi was to begin at 08:00 and the second would start when the first had brought results. This was later changed and both attacks were to begin at 08:00.

The Soviet main effort was to make a front assault with two regiments 609th and 364th over the Tolvajärvi lake onto the Finnish positions of the 16th regiment near Tolvajärvi village, while the Soviet 718th regiment was to make a  flanking maneuver from the north to the Finnish rear across thick wooded areas.

There was a thick fog over a single narrow unimproved rural muddy road towards Tolvajärvi that was winding amongst some dozens of small lakes. Due to thick fog, aviation did not take part in the battle. Due to mud, many tanks got stuck and also did not actively participate in the battle and were lost during withdrawal.

Composition

 Finnish side (4,000):
 Talvela Group of the 4th Corps (16th Infantry Regiment)
 Rjasjanen detachment (4 separate battalions and one artillery battalion of the 6th Artillery Regiment)

The Finnish side consisted of 7 infantry battalions and 30 pieces of artillery.

The Finnish 16th Infantry Regiment was composed of workers out of Tampere city and headed by the chief of police of Tampere.

 Soviet side (20,000):
 139th Rifle Division of the 8th Army (718th, 609th, 364th Rifle regiments)

The Soviet side consisted of 9 infantry battalions, 60 artillery pieces, one scout battalion, one signal battalion, one sapper battalion, 30 tanks, and 376 planes.

Battle
The northern group consisting of two battalions soon met Soviet resistance. In fact, they met the Soviet 718th Rifle Regiment of the 139th Rifle Division, which was preparing to make its own attack on the Finnish flank. By noon, the Finnish troops withdrew to their own lines. Although this attack did not fulfill its objectives, it prevented the 718th from attacking the Finnish flank, and also from sending reinforcements to the south.

While the second battalion of the Finnish 16th (infantry) Regiment (II/JR 16) was preparing to attack along the road, it was interrupted by an attack from the Soviet 609th Regiment. The Finns were still able to attack after they got some artillery support. The Finnish attack continued towards a hotel located on a thin isthmus between the two lakes. Pajari decided to commit his reserves in a pincer attack at the Soviet troops around the hotel. In the end, the hotel was captured and in it were found a dead Soviet regimental commander and all the regiment's papers.

The Finns withdrew over the lakes for the night. Contact was also made with the Soviet 75th Rifle Division, which had been sent as reinforcements.

Aftermath
Finnish losses were over 100 dead and 250 wounded. The Soviet losses are thought to be over 5000 dead and a lot of equipment: the guns of two artillery batteries, AT-guns, some twenty tanks (amongst others T-26s) and 60 machine guns. The battle was an important offensive victory for the Finns and was very important for the morale of the whole Finnish Army. No major battles were fought in this region after the successful Finnish counter-attack. Only a few shots were fired occasionally. The Finns held the line to the end of the Winter War.

Two commanders from Finnish side were promoted. Paavo Talvela was promoted from colonel to major general on 18 December 1939. Aaro Pajari was promoted to colonel on 18 December 1939. General Belyaev was dismissed from commanding on 16 December 1939, but preserved his rank. In June 1940 after re-attestation he was granted the rank of major general.

Gallery

Notes

See also 

 List of Finnish military equipment of World War II
 List of Soviet Union military equipment of World War II

References

External links
  How did the USSR lose a battle to Finland because of a sausage? – Politics and Weapons (Как СССР проиграл битву Финляндии из-за колбасы? - Политика и Оружие). Ukrlife (YouTube video). 12 December 2017.

Battles and operations of the Winter War
1939 in Finland
December 1939 events
Tolvajärvi
History of Karelia
Suoyarvsky District